Symplocos zizyphoides is a plant in the family Symplocaceae, native to Borneo. The specific epithet zizyphoides refers to the species' resemblance to those in the genus Ziziphus.

Description
The brown twigs have a zig-zag shape. The inflorescences feature racemes of up to four white flowers, or flowers may be solitary.

Distribution and habitat
Symplocos zizyphoides is endemic to Borneo, where it is known mainly from Mount Kinabalu in Sabah.

References

zizyphoides
Endemic flora of Borneo
Flora of Mount Kinabalu
Plants described in 1894
Taxa named by Otto Stapf